Maloshuyka is an urban locality (an urban-type settlement) in Onezhsky District of Arkhangelsk Oblast, Russia, located on the Maloshuyka River  off the White Sea coast and  southwest of the town of Onega. Municipally, it is the administrative center of Maloshuyskoye Urban Settlement, one of the two urban settlements in the district. Population: .

History

Maloshuyka is an old Pomor village. In 1924, it became the administrative center of Pomorskaya Volost of Onezhsky Uyezd, Arkhangelsk Governorate. On July 15, 1929, all volosts were abolished, and Maloshuyka became the center of Maloshuysky Selsoviet of Onezhsky District, Northern Krai.

Maloshuyka was granted urban-type settlement status in 1943.

Economy
The main employer of Maloshuyka is the railroad. Maloshuyka is located on the railway line which branches off in Obozerskaya railway station from the railroad between Moscow and Arkhangelsk and runs west to Onega and Belomorsk where it joins the railroad between Petrozavodsk and Murmansk. The railroad was built during World War II to secure the transport of goods from the harbor of Murmansk to central Russia.

Culture and recreation
Close to Maloshuyka, in the village of Abramovskaya, the ensemble of the Maloshuyka Pogost, consisting of wooden St. Nicholas Church (1638), the Presentation of Jesus at the Temple (1873), and the bell-tower (1825), is located. This is one of the few remaining wooden triple church ensembles, which consist of two churches (a bigger, unheated, church is used in the summer; a smaller, heated church, is used in the winter; and a bell-tower).

The wooden Ascension Church (17th century) which was located in the village of Kusheretskaya was moved to the Malye Korely open-air museum.

References

Notes

Sources

Urban-type settlements in Arkhangelsk Oblast
Populated places in Onezhsky District
Onezhsky Uyezd